Charles Stinson (1800–1878) was a two-time member of the New Hampshire legislature.

Life
Stinson, a military captain, was from Goffstown, New Hampshire. He was the father of four children, Jane, Letitia, Susan, and Mary. Mary was the wife of Minneapolis industrialist Charles Alfred Pillsbury.

Charles Pillsbury was influential in naming a street after the Stinson family in Stinson Boulevard, Minneapolis.

References

People from Goffstown, New Hampshire
1800 births
Members of the New Hampshire House of Representatives
1878 deaths
19th-century American politicians